Nasrullah Khan Khattak (born 1923 - 2 November 2009) was a Pakistani politician, who was the 6th elected Chief Minister of Khyber-Pakhtunkhwa and served from 3 May 1975 to 19 April 1977.

Early life and education 
He was born in 1923 in the village of Manki Sharif to Mir Aslam Khan Khattak. He belonged to the Khattak tribe and he was the cousin of Pervez Khattak.

Political career 
Nasrullah Khattak started his political career when he was elected as chairman of the Manki Sharif Union Council in 1962. He was also elected as member of the West Pakistan Assembly during the time of President Ayub Khan.

He joined Pakistan Peoples Party (PPP) in 1967, when the party was launched and he was a close friend of Zulifar Ali Bhutto. He was one of the founding leaders of PPP and played an important role in establishing the party in the North-West Frontier Province. He was also the Pakistani Ambassador to Tunisia during his political career. After the assassination of PPP's Hayat Muhammad Khan Sherpao, Khattak was made Chief Minister of the North-West Frontier Province now known as Khyber Pakhtunkhwa. He was defeated in the 1977 election and was never re-elected to the assembly.

In his later years, he joined Tehrik-e-Istiqlal later called Qaumi Jamhoori Party (QJP) of Asghar Khan and served as Central Vice President of the party.

Death 
Nasrullah Khattak died due to cardiac arrest on 2 November 2009 at the age of 86. He was buried in Manki Sharif graveyard and people attended his funeral in large numbers.

See also 
 List of Chief Ministers of Khyber Pakhtunkhwa
 Khyber Pakhtunkhwa

References 

Chief Ministers of Khyber Pakhtunkhwa
1923 births
2009 deaths
Pashtun people